The 1902 Washington football team was an American football team that represented the University of Washington during the 1902 college football season. In its first season under coach James Knight, the team compiled a 5–1 record and outscored its opponents by a combined total of 65 to 17. Fred McElmon was the team captain.

Schedule

References

Washington
Washington Huskies football seasons
Washington football